Shen Mengchen (born 13 June 1989) is a Chinese actress, host and model of Tujia ethnicity.

Early life and education
Shen was born in Jishou, Hunan on June 13, 1989. She graduated from Hunan University, where she majored in acting.

Career
Shen first came to public attention in 2010 at the age of 19, appearing on Good Women.

She made her film debut in Fall in Love with You (2014), playing the love interest of Du Haitao's character.  Her first main role in a television came with The Loving Home, alongside Yu Haoming, Pan Shiqi, and Li Tai.

On television in 2015, Shen had key supporting role in the romance television series The Wife's Lies.

She made a guest appearance as Meng Chen on Mad about You (2016). She starred opposite Wu Qian, Kim Tae-hwan and Fu Jia in My Amazing Boyfriend.

In 2017, Shen co-starred with Ma Ke and Qi Wei in the wuxia television series New Dragon Gate Inn, a remake of Raymond Lee's film New Dragon Gate Inn. That same year, she starred in a historical television series called Chong Er's Preach with Wang Longhua, Zhang Yishan, Baby Zhang, Madina Memet, Purba Rgyal, and Bobo Gan.

Personal life
As of 2016, Shen has been in a relationship with variety show host and actor Du Haitao.

As of 18 February 2022 , Shen is married to Du Haitao.

Filmography

Film

Television

As host

References

External links

1989 births
People from Xiangxi
Living people
Hunan University alumni
Chinese film actresses
Chinese television actresses
Chinese female models
Actresses from Hunan
Chinese television presenters
Chinese women television presenters